Barpetia dialect (native: borpeita) is a modern regional subdialect of Kamrupi, a dialect of the Assamese language.  Named after the current Barpeta district of Assam, it is the westernmost of the Kamrupi group of dialects.  This dialect has community variations within itself.

Characteristics
 Whereas most of the other Kamrupi dialects have a seven-term vowel system, Barpetia has eight.
 Whereas most of the other Kamrupi dialects follow a four-term verb system, Barpetia follows a five-five term system

Grammar

Verb
For different types of verbs.

Notes

References

Assamese language
Kamrupi culture
Languages of Assam
Eastern Indo-Aryan languages